Kannapolis Citizen is a newspaper based in Kannapolis, North Carolina covering Cabarrus, Mecklenburg, and Rowan counties. The paper started circulation in mid-2003. As of 2010, the paper was no longer in business.

References

Newspapers published in North Carolina